Events from the year 1705 in England.

Incumbents
 Monarch – Anne
 Parliament – 1st of Queen Anne (until 5 April), 2nd of Queen Anne (starting 14 July)

Events
 16 April – Isaac Newton knighted by Queen Anne.
 May
 General election results in no clear majority for either political faction in Parliament.
 The Twelfth Siege of Gibraltar ends with the defending Confederate forces (including the English) retaining control of the town.
 25 September – Queen Anne appoints commissioners to negotiate political union with Scotland.
 15 October – War of the Spanish Succession: Charles Mordaunt, 3rd Earl of Peterborough leads an English naval force in the capture of Barcelona.
 30 October – John Vanbrugh's play The Confederacy (adapted from the French) is first performed at his new London playhouse, The Queen's Theatre in Haymarket.
 27 December – John Vanbrugh's play The Mistake (adapted from the French) is first performed at his new London playhouse, The Queen's Theatre in Haymarket.
 December – the Sophia Naturalization Act is passed by Parliament, which naturalizes Sophia of Hanover (next in succession to the British throne) and the "issue of her body" as British subjects.

Undated
 Construction begins on Blenheim Palace in Oxfordshire designed by John Vanbrugh for the Duke of Marlborough. It is completed in 1724.
 Edmond Halley publicly predicts the periodicity of Halley's Comet and computes its expected path of return in 1757.

Births
 21 February – Edward Hawke, 1st Baron Hawke, naval officer (died 1781)
 11 April – William Cookworthy, chemist (died 1780)
 23 July – Francis Blomefield, topographer (died 1752)
 30 August – David Hartley, philosopher (died 1757)
 21 September (bapt.) – Dick Turpin, thief and highwayman (hanged 1739)
 28 September – Henry Fox, 1st Baron Holland, statesman (died 1774)
 23 November – Thomas Birch, historian (died 1766)
 Undated – Bay Bolton, racehorse (died 1736)

Deaths
 17 January – John Ray, naturalist (born 1627)
 6 April – Sir William Lowther, 1st Baronet, of Marske, landowner and Member of Parliament (born 1676)
 12 July – Titus Oates, conspirator (born 1649)

References

 
Years of the 18th century in England